Two-time defending champion Shingo Kunieda defeated Stéphane Houdet in the final, 6–3, 3–6, 6–3 to win the men's singles wheelchair tennis title at the 2009 French Open. It was his third French Open singles title and seventh major singles title overall.

Seeds
 Shingo Kunieda (champion)
 Stéphane Houdet (final)

Draw

Finals

External links
Draw

Wheelchair Men's Singles
French Open, 2009 Men's Singles